Pali Naka is an area in Bandra-Khar. The Pali Hill locality is famous as the residence of several Bollywood film stars.

Pali Naka is synonymous with Pali Market - a bustling energetic bazaar at the foot of Pali Hill. It is dotted with several vegetable hawkers selling exotic and regular vegetables, Jude Bakery - an old bread & eggs store which has been around for years, general provisions stores, wine shops, furniture stores, key makers and chemists. There is also a small police station at Pali Naka.

This part of Mumbai also draws a lot of expatriates and the stores at Pali Naka have evolved to meet everybody's food requirements.

Little ahead, down the road, there are several restaurants and pubs frequented by the locals and migrant population of Mumbai. The landmark is iconic - with some places like Toto's Garage Pub having cult following.

See also
Pali Hill

References

Bandra